The 2005 Minnesota Golden Gophers football team represented the University of Minnesota during the 2005 NCAA Division I-A football season.  The team's head coach was Glen Mason. Minnesota played its home games at the Metrodome in Minneapolis, Minnesota.  The most notable win of the season came as Minnesota defeated Michigan to win the Little Brown Jug for the first time since 1986.

Previous season
2004 was the eighth season under head coach Glen Mason. He led the team to a 7–5 record and an appearance in the Music City Bowl. The Gophers won their first five games before falling in five of their final seven contests.

Polls
The 2005 Minnesota Golden Gophers football team was not ranked in either the final Coaches' Poll or AP Poll.

Schedule

Roster

Rankings

Game summaries

Tulsa

All-time record against Tulsa: 2–0–0

The Gophers open the 2005 season in dominating fashion.  Laurence Maroney rushed for 203 yards and 2 touchdowns.  Bryan Cupito added 235 yards passing and 1 touchdown.  Gary Russell had only six carries but two touchdowns, both coming in the fourth quarter.

Colorado State

All-time record against Colorado State: 2–0–0

The Gophers continued their high scoring ways to open the season, romping over Colorado State. Laurence Maroney had another big day, rushing for 133 yards and 2 touchdowns.  Gary Russell had 2 touchdowns on seven carries.  The Golden Gophers had fantastic average field position, starting at their own 40-yard line, but Tulsa averaged their starting at their own 21-yard line.

Florida Atlantic

All-time record against Florida Atlantic: 1–0–0

The Golden Gophers won the third game of the season, defeating the Florida Atlantic Owls.  Bryan Cupito passed 10 for 17 and 230 yards, with 2 touchdowns.  Laurence Maroney and Gary Russell each scored two touchdowns on the day.  The Minnesota rushing attack accumulated 349 yards on the ground.  The Gophers once again had better field position than their opponents, as the Gophers were 16 yards better than the Owls, starting at the 37-yard line.

Purdue

All-time record against Purdue: 31–28–3 (as of 2005)

The Golden Gophers won their fourth game of the season, winning in double overtime of Purdue.  Laurence Maroney had another big day for the Golden Gophers, rushing for 217 yards.  Bryan Cupito passed for 271 yards and three touchdowns.  He also rushed for a two-point conversion in the waning time of the fourth quarter, giving a tying score that would eventually force overtime.  Logan Payne caught a touchdown in the first overtime, and Gary Russell scored the go-ahead touchdown in the second overtime, giving Minnesota the victory.

Penn State

All-time record against Penn State: 4–5–0 (as of 2005)

Penn State raced out to a 20-point lead on the way to a 30-point victory over the Golden Gophers.  Minnesota's normally potent ground game was held to 113 yards.  Bryan Cupito passed for 174 yards on the day.  The Golden Gophers turned the ball over twice, compared to no turnovers for the Nittany Lions.  The Nittany Lions regained the Governor's Victory Bell for the first time since 1998.

Michigan

Source: ESPN
    
    
    
    
    
    
    
    
    

All-time record against Michigan: 24–67–3 (as of 2005)

The Minnesota Golden Gophers won the Little Brown Jug for the first time since 1986.  Laurence Maroney rushed for 129 yards on the day.  Gary Russell ran for 128 yards on the day, nearly half the yards coming from one rush with under two minutes left in the game.  That rush set up a final field goal by Jason Giannini.  It was the first win for the Golden Gophers under Glen Mason.  It was Michigan's was third loss on the season.

Wisconsin

All-time record against Wisconsin: 59–48–8 (as of 2005)

Coming off one of the biggest wins in recent memory, the Golden Gophers faced off against border rival, Wisconsin.  The two teams traded the lead through the first half.  With 3:27 left in the game, the Golden Gophers stretched the lead to 34–24.  The Badgers then scored a touchdown, bringing the lead back down to a three-point gap.  With 30 seconds left, the Badgers blocked a punt and recovered it for a touchdown.  The Badgers kept Paul Bunyan's Axe for the second straight year.

Ohio State

All-time record against Ohio State: 7–38–0 (as of 2005)

Minnesota dropped the game to Ohio State, despite a solid performance from the Golden Gophers offense.  Bryan Cupito had 26 completions on 35 attempts, and had 395 yards passing.  Laurence Maroney rushed for 125 yards.  The Golden Gophers out gained the Buckeyes by 130 yards on offense, but had several drives stall.  Twice the ball was turned over on downs, once on a missed field goal, and the Gophers had one fumble.

Indiana

All-time record against Indiana: 35–25–3 (as of 2005)

Minnesota's Gary Russell rushed for 188 yards and three touchdowns on the way to the first Gopher victory in Indiana since 1985.  The Golden Gophers had 200 more yards of offensive production on the day.  The Golden Gophers broke the game open, scoring four touchdowns.  Gary Russell had three touchdowns on the day.  Minnesota had no turnovers on the day.  The Gophers were successful on seven of the twelve third-down attempts.  The win made the Golden Gophers bowl eligible.

Michigan State

All-time record against Michigan State: 15–25–0 (as of 2005)

Amir Pinnix rushed for 206 yards as the Golden Gophers won, 41–18.  Bryan Cupito only passed 13 times, but connected on eight of those passes, and two touchdowns.  The Golden Gophers had only two drives on the game that didn't result in a score.  In addition, the Gophers dominated the time of possession, having offensive control for 36 minutes in the game.  The Spartans missed two field goal attempts on the game.

Iowa

All-time record against Iowa: 58–39–2 (as of 2005)

In the 99th addition of the Minnesota-Iowa rivalry, the Golden Gophers dropped their fifth straight game to the Hawkeyes.  Bryan Cupito passed for 315 yards, but had two interceptions and barely more than a 50 percent passing completion.  Defensively, the Golden Gophers gave up 615 yards of offense.  Two different Hawkeye running backs eclipsed 100 yards rushing, and Iowa's Drew Tate threw for 351 yards passing and four touchdowns.  Iowa continued to retain the Floyd of Rosedale trophy.

Virginia

All-time record against Virginia: 0–1–0

In the Golden Gophers' third appearance in the Music City Bowl, the Gophers dropped a close game against Virginia.  Bryan Cupito passed for 263 yards and 4 touchdowns on the day.  Running back Laurence Maroney rushed for 109 yards.  The Gophers lost the lead for the first time with 1:08 remaining as they gave up a 39-yard field goal try.  The loss was the Gophers' first loss in a bowl game since 2000.

References

Minnesota
Minnesota Golden Gophers football seasons
Minnesota Golden Gophers football